Ricardo Siri (Buenos Aires, November 15, 1973), better known by the name Liniers, is an Argentine cartoonist.

Early life
Liniers is related to viceroy Santiago de Liniers. He began drawing from a very early age; he has remarked that he began to draw in order to enjoy movies at home.  "I wanted to have Star Wars and the only way to have it was to draw it.  So we could look at it whenever we wanted to."   His father was a lawyer and his mother worked at various jobs, including making slippers and little paintings.  He has two younger siblings and is married to the  writer Angie Erhardt del Campo. They have three daughters named Matilda, Clementina, and Emma.

Career
In regards to the name he uses for his comic strips, Liniers has remarked: "Liniers is my second name.  In Buenos Aires there was a viceroy named Liniers, who ended up being executed by firing squad.  He was my ancestor, something like a greatgreatgreatgrandfather.  So when I began to sign my comic strips, I used the name, because I like it when things don't have names appropriate to what they are – for example, the teddy bear in my comic strip is called Madariaga [which is usually a surname]. Who has ever heard of a teddy bear with such a name? I thought that such an absurd name had to be worth something."

He studied advertising, but ultimately decided to pursue a career in comics. His work is influenced by Patrick McDonnell, Hergé, Goscinny and Uderzo, Quino, Héctor Germán Oesterheld and Francisco Solano López, Charles Schulz and George Herriman.  He started working in fanzines, then moved on to magazines and newspapers.  His work has been featured in Lugares, ¡Suélteme!, Hecho en Buenos Aires, Calles, Zona de Obras, Consecuencias y ¡Qué suerte! (España), Olho Mágico (Brazil), 9-11 Artists respond (USA), and Comix 2000 (France).

Along with Santiago Rial Ungaro, Liniers published Warhol para principiantes (Warhol for beginners), for Ediciones Era Naciente in 2001.

Liniers appeared as a presenter at the second Pecha Kucha night in Buenos Aires, October 3, 2006.

In September 1999 he started publishing a weekly strip called Bonjour in NO!, a supplement of Página/12. Bonjour is very experimental and features some adult language, and showcases many characters that would reappear in later works.  Bonjour appeared for the last time on June 27, 2002.

In June 2002, fellow cartoonist Maitena got him into the Argentine newspaper La Nación, where he began a new daily strip called Macanudo, which appears on the last page of the paper. Just like Bonjour, Macanudo is very experimental and deals with meta humor. Four volumes of Macanudo have been translated into English by Mara Faye Lethem and published in the United States by Enchanted Lion Books.

Conejo de viaje (Travelling Rabbit or Rabbit on the Road) (2008) is a collection of illustrated travel journals that describe his journeys through France, Portugal, Germany, Spain, Argentina, and Antarctica (which includes sojourns on Antarctic islands such as Cuverville Island).

The Big Wet Balloon, a TOON Book (El Globo Grande y Mojado) (Pub date: Sept 10, 2013) is the first book by Liniers published in the U.S. In 2014 the artist illustrated some covers for The New Yorker

Bibliography
Macanudo Nº1  (April 2004) 
Macanudo Nº2  (April 2005)
Bonjour  (December 2005)
Macanudo Nº3  (April 2006)
Macanudo Nº4  (December 2006)
Cuadernos 1985-2005  (December 2006)
Lo que hay antes de que haya algo (June 2007) – children's book (English: What there is before there is anything there)
Macanudo Nº5  (October 2007)
Macanudo Nº6  (2008)
Conejo de viaje (2008) – (English: Travelling Rabbit or Rabbit on the Road)
Oops! (2008), joint work with Kevin Johansen
El Macanudo Universal - Vols. 1-5  (2009)
Macanudo Nº7 (2009)
Macanudismo (2010)
Macanudo Nº8 (2010)
Macanudo Nº9 (2012)
Macanudo Nº10 (2013)
 El Globo Grande y Mojado and The Big Wet Balloon, a TOON Book (TOON Books/Candlewick Press, September 2013) – picture book in simultaneous Spanish and English-language editions 
 Escrito y Dibujado por Enriqueta (TOON, 2015), ; Written and Drawn by Henrietta (TOON, 2015),  – English translation by Liniers, one runner-up for the 2016 Batchelder Award 
Buenas Noches, Planeta (2017); Good Night, Planet – Winner of the 2018 Eisner Award for Best Publication for Early Readers (up to age 8).

Albums
 Logo by Kevin Johansen
 La Lengua Popular by Andrés Calamaro – for which Liniers won the Gardel Prize for best cover art

References

External links

 Cosas que te pasan si estás vivo – Liniers' comic blog 
 Liniers at Lambiek Comiclopedia
 The Big Wet Balloon, a TOON Book in English and Spanish.
 

1973 births
People from Buenos Aires
Argentine cartoonists
The New Yorker people
Living people
Argentine people of French descent
Argentine people of Italian descent